Gillespie is a city in Macoupin County, Illinois, United States, and part of the Metro East region of the St. Louis metropolitan area. The population was 3,168 at the 2020 census.

History
The first group of settlers arrived to what is now Gillespie in the late 1820s from Kentucky, Ohio, and Indiana. The township thrived in the 1830s, increasing in population and businesses. In 1835 the first schoolhouse was built. Gillespie was officially incorporated as a town in the spring of 1853. By 1904, the population rose to 3,100 and there were a number of businesses, churches, and schools. On January 29, 1905, a fire swept through the business district and destroyed most businesses and some homes.

For years, Gillespie's main source of employment were the multiple coal mines scattered throughout the township operated by the Chicago & Northwestern Railroad Company. It is said that Gillespie boasted three of the largest coal mines in the world.

Gillespie is named for Judge Joseph Gillespie, who was active in Illinois state politics.

Geography

Gillespie is located mainly in eastern Gillespie Township but extends east into the west part of Cahokia Township. It is bordered to the north by the village of East Gillespie.

Illinois Routes 4 and 16 pass through Gillespie, joining in the center of town as East Elm Street. Route 4 leads north  to Carlinville, the county seat, and south  to Staunton. Route 16 leads northeast  to Litchfield and west  to Jerseyville.

The city is drained to the southeast by Bear Creek, a tributary of Cahokia Creek, which runs to the Mississippi River northeast of St. Louis. To the northwest are Old and New Gillespie Lakes, reservoirs on the Dry Fork of Macoupin Creek, a west-flowing tributary of the Illinois River.

Demographics

As of the census of 2000, there were 3,412 people, 1,452 households, and 936 families residing in the city. The racial makeup of the city was 98.56% White, 0.32% African American, 0.21% Native American, 0.12% Asian, 0.06% Pacific Islander, 0.15% from other races, and 0.59% from two or more races. Hispanic or Latino people of any race were 0.73% of the population.

There were 1,452 households, of which 28.9% had children under the age of 18 living with them, 50.8% were married couples living together, 9.9% had a female householder with no husband present, and 35.5% were non-families. 31.0% of all households were made up of individuals, and 16.4% had someone living alone who was 65 years of age or older. The average household size was 2.35 and the average family size was 2.93.

In the city, the population was spread out, with 23.3% under the age of 18, 9.3% from 18 to 24, 27.3% from 25 to 44, 22.7% from 45 to 64, and 17.4% who were 65 years of age or older. The median age was 39 years. For every 100 females, there were 88.3 males. For every 100 females age 18 and over, there were 86.1 males.

The median income for a household in the city was $33,168, and the median income for a family was $40,500. Males had a median income of $35,032 versus $23,136 for females. The per capita income for the city was $19,042. About 8.6% of families and 12.4% of the population were below the poverty line, including 17.4% of those under age 18 and 9.5% of those age 65 or over.

Education
Gillespie is home to Gillespie C.U.S.D. #7, which operates Gillespie High School, Gillespie Middle School, and Ben-Gil Elementary School.

Services
The city of Gillespie provides police protection for the neighboring communities of Benld, Mount Clare, and Eagarville. In addition Gillespie supplies water to Benld, Sawyerville, Wilsonville, Mount Clare, Dorchester, East Gillespie, and Eagarville, as well as sewer services to East Gillespie and Eagarville.

Notable people 

Ferras Alqais, singer-songwriter
W. Russell Arrington, Illinois state legislator and lawyer; born in Gillespie
Vince Demuzio, Illinois state legislator; born in Gillespie
Clarence J. Goodnight, zoologist; born in Gillespie
Howard Keel, film and television actor and singer
William D. Lyons, coal miner and Illinois state legislator; lived in Gillespie
Harry Patton, pitcher for the St. Louis Cardinals; born in Gillespie
Raphael Tracey, U.S. soccer player and member of the National Soccer Hall of Fame; born in Gillespie
Stuart J. Traynor, lawyer and Illinois state legislator; born in Gillespie

References

Cities in Illinois
Cities in Macoupin County, Illinois